Virginia R. Moreno (24 April 1923 – 14 August 2021) was a Filipina writer, poet, and playwright.

Early life and education 
Moreno was born in the Tondo neighbourhood of Manila on 24 April 1923. She studied at the University of the Philippines, where she was editor of the campus newspaper, and at the Kansas Institute of International Education.

Career 
Her first collection of poems Batik Maker and Other Poems was published in 1972; it received the Palanca Memorial Award for Literature. Her play Straw Patriot (1956) was translated into Filipino by Wilfredo Pascua Sanchez in 1967 as Bayaning huwad. In 1969, she won the National Historical Playwriting Contest for her play The Onyx Wolf, also known as La Loba Negra and Itim Asu. Also in 1969, she studied at the British Film Institute in London under a British Council grant. In 1973, she was co-director of the documentary The Imaginative Community: 7 Poets in Iowa. Moreno also took part in the International Writing Program at the University of Iowa. In 1976, she became director of the University of the Philippines Film Center.

In 1984, Moreno received a S.E.A. Write Award. In 1991, she was named Chevalier in the Ordre des Palmes Académiques by France. She has also served as chair of the UNESCO Culture Committee of the Philippines.

Personal life and death 
Moreno died on 14 August 2021, at the age of 98.

References 

1923 births
2021 deaths
20th-century Filipino poets
Filipino dramatists and playwrights
Filipino film directors
Filipino women film directors
People from Tondo, Manila
Writers from Manila
S.E.A. Write Award winners
Chevaliers of the Ordre des Palmes Académiques
Palanca Award recipients
International Writing Program alumni
Filipino women poets
21st-century Filipino poets
20th-century Filipino women writers
21st-century Filipino educators
21st-century Filipino women writers